A hairshirt is a cilice, an uncomfortable shirt worn by some Catholics and, earlier, by Jews as a sign of penance. Hairshirt may also refer to:

Hairshirt (film), a 1998 motion picture starring Dean Paras, Chris Hogan, Evan Glenn and Neve Campbell
"Hairshirt", a song by R.E.M. from the album Green